Blow Hot, Blow Cold (also known as The Island) is a 1969 Italian thriller-drama film directed by Florestano Vancini.

Plot
A complex love story in the setting of a summer holiday in the beautiful islands off the coast of Puglia (Italy). Here we find two couples: an irregular but happy Italian youth pair and the other Swedish, more mature and legal. Gunnar Lindmark is a professor of psychology, while his wife Meret find here a reminiscent of an old extramarital love, ceased because of her lover's death. This crisis triggers jealousy of the professor who kills the Italian guy.

Cast 
 Giuliano Gemma as Giulio
 Rosemary Dexter as Letizia, lover of Giulio
 Gunnar Björnstrand as Gunnar Lindmark
 Bibi Andersson as Meret, wife of Gunnar 
 Amos Davoli as The Judge
 Brizio Montinaro as The Barman

References

External links

1969 films
Films directed by Florestano Vancini
Films scored by Carlo Rustichelli
Italian thriller drama films
1960s thriller drama films
1969 drama films
1960s Italian-language films
1960s Italian films